Phuntsho Jigme (born 11 September 1997) is a Bhutanese international footballer. His first appearance for Bhutan was in the SAFF Cup 2018 playing against Bangladesh. He was a substitute player for Bhutan in the 2019 South Asian Games.

References

External links 
Phuntsho Jigme at National-Football-Teams.com

Bhutanese footballers
Bhutan international footballers
Living people
Association football defenders
1997 births